Miss Indonesia 2012 is the eighth edition of Miss Indonesia. The pageant was held at Hall D2 JIExpo, Kemayoran on April 28, 2012, and was hosted by Ferdi Hassan and Amanda Zevannya. The current titleholder of Miss World, Ivian Sarcos attended the awarding night, when Astrid Ellena of East Java crowned her successor, Ines Putri Chandra from Bali.

Results

Placements

Fast Track Winners
Fast track events held during preliminary round and the winners of Fast Track events are automatically qualified to enter the semifinal round. This year's fast track events include: Talent, Sport, Modelling, and Beauty With A Purpose.

 Aceh - Rafiqa Soraya Azhar (Talent)
 Gorontalo - Patricia Gunawan (Beauty with A Purpose)
 West Java - Adila Wisusena (Sport) 
 Yogyakarta - Dea Amelia Irwanto (Modelling)

Special awards

Judges
Liliana Tanoesoedibjo
Martha Tilaar
Harry Darsono
Ferry Salim
Adam Chesnof

Contestants

 Aceh - Rafiqa Soraya Azhar
 Bali - Ines Putri Tjiptadi Chandra
 Bangka-Belitung Islands - Kanty Widjaja
 Banten - Anastasia Praditha
 Bengkulu - Galuh Adika Alifani
 Central Java - Maria Gabriella
 Central Kalimantan - Cindy Tabita
 Central Sulawesi - Tasya Eunike Watania
 East Java - Ovi Dian Aryani Putri
 East Kalimantan - Riva Tamara Indra
 East Nusa Tenggara - Dona Maria Rosalia da Silva
 Gorontalo - Patricia Gunawan
 Jakarta SCR - Jennifer Sumia
 Jambi - Tarisya Ramantha
 Lampung - Vany Rizky Ayunda
 Maluku - Inggrid Elizabeth
 North Maluku - Natasha Gabriella
 North Sulawesi - Nathania Lukman
 North Sumatra - Kastria Soldiana Elizabeth Hutagaol
 Papua - Dina Michelle Parwestri
 Riau - Diana Kristiana Lesmana
 Riau Islands - Ayu Meivitasari
 South Kalimantan - Levina Faby Naomi
 South Sulawesi - Nur Fitriyani Faridin
 South Sumatra - Stef Hanie Michella
 Southeast Sulawesi - Sujayanti Pirono
 West Java - Adila Wisusena
 West Kalimantan - Meiling Thomas
 West Nusa Tenggara - Devi Oktaviani
 West Papua - Fitrah Islami
 West Sulawesi - Vanni Adriani Puspanegara
 West Sumatra - Santry Hendrodjanoe
 Yogyakarta - Dea Amelia Irwanto

Crossovers
Miss Indonesia Earth
2012: : Kastria Hutagaol (1st Runner Up / Miss Air Indonesia)
2013: : Kanty Widjaja (1st Runner Up / Miss Air Indonesia)
Wajah Femina
2013: : Kastria Hutagaol

References

External links
 Official site

2012 beauty pageants
Miss Indonesia